The 48th Boat Race took place on 21 March 1891.  The Boat Race is an annual side-by-side rowing race between crews from the Universities of Oxford and Cambridge along the River Thames.  Oxford went into the race leading 24–22 in the event overall.  In total, eight rowers who were participating had previous Boat Race experience.  Umpired by former Oxford rower Frank Willan, pre-race favourites Oxford won by half-a-length in a time of 21 minutes 48 seconds.  It was Oxford's narrowest winning margin since the 1867 race.

Background

The Boat Race is a side-by-side rowing competition between the boat clubs of University of Oxford (sometimes referred to as the "Dark Blues") and the University of Cambridge (sometimes referred to as the "Light Blues").  The race was first held in 1829, and since 1845 has taken place on the  Championship Course on the River Thames in southwest London.  The rivalry is a major point of honour between the two universities, as of 2014 it is followed throughout the United Kingdom and broadcast worldwide. Oxford went into the race as reigning champions, having beaten Cambridge by one length in the previous year's race, and held the overall lead, with 24 victories to Cambridge's 22 (excluding the "dead heat" of 1877).

Cambridge were coached by Arthur Middleton Hutchinson (who had rowed for the Light Blues in the 1881 and 1882 races) while Oxford's coach was R. C. Lehmann, former president of the Cambridge Union Society and captain of the 1st Trinity Boat Club.  Although Lehmann had rowed in the trials eights for Cambridge, he was never selected for the Blue boat.

The umpire for the race for the third year in a row was Frank Willan who won the event four consecutive times, rowing for Oxford in the 1866, 1867, 1868 and 1869 races.

Crews

Cambridge saw four former Blues return to the boat, in Gilbert Francklyn, Edmund Towers Fison, John Friend Rowlatt and Cambridge University Boat Club president Gerard Elin. Oxford's crew contained four rowers with Boat Race experience, including Guy Nickalls who was rowing in his fourth consecutive race, this year alongside his brother Vivian. The Dark Blues also featured cox John Pemberton Heywood-Lonsdale for the third time in a row.

Four of the Oxford crew were studying at Magdalen College while five of the Cambridge crew had matriculated to Trinity Hall. Two rowers were registered as non-British, F. Wilkinson for Oxford and Edward Wason Lord for Cambridge both hailed from Australia.  Wilkinson was forced to leave the Oxford crew during practice as he suffered from influenza;  he was considered sufficiently fit to return to the crew but, according to Drinkwater, "never found his real form again".

Race

Oxford were pre-race favourites, and won the toss and elected to start from the Middlesex station, handing the Surrey side of the river to Cambridge. The race commenced at 11:09 a.m., in a northerly wind, and despite being outrated by Cambridge, the Dark Blues took an early lead and were a quarter of a length ahead as the crews passed Craven Steps.  Just before the Mile Post, Oxford's lead was around half a length, but Cambridge pushed on to take the lead by Hammersmith Bridge.  Oxford responded and held a marginal lead as the crews passed The Doves pub, and the boats exchanged the lead several times along Chiswick Reach.

The Dark Blues took the lead and were three-quarters of a length up at Barnes Bridge.  Elin increased Cambridge's stroke rate; Charles Kent, the Oxford stroke responded and although the bend in the river favoured the Dark Blues, Cambridge closed the gap.  However, it was too late to stop Oxford taking the victory.  The Dark Blues passed the finishing post with a half-length lead in a time of 21 minutes 48 seconds.  It was their second consecutive victory and the narrowest winning margin since the 1867 race, taking the overall record to 25–22 in Oxford's favour.

References
Notes

Bibliography

External links
 Official website

1891 in English sport
The Boat Race
March 1891 sports events